Hapcheon County (Hapcheon-gun) is a county in South Gyeongsang Province, South Korea.

Located in northwestern Gyeongsangnam-do, the county is surrounded by Changnyeong as well as Euiryeong to the Southeast, Geochang as well as Sancheong-gun to the West. High and precipitous hills are densely situated and the eastern part is flatter by the flowing streams of the Nakdong River.

Famous people born in the county include former South Korean president Chun Doo-hwan.

Places of interest
Haeinsa is a famous temple located in Hapcheon county.

Mt. Namsan Jeilbong is known for its climbing trails year-round views. Its address is Chiin-li, Gaya-myun, Hapcheon, Gyeongnam.

Special products
Paprika is a popular agriculture good cultivated on the highlands of Mt. Gaya during the summer season. It is hence called Gaya paprika. This paprika is often exported to Japan.

Tourism
Hapcheon is home to the "Imagination" theme park. In the park, people can play a survival game under an imaginative war state.

Hapcheon lake is also a tourist spot bordering Sancheong county. It is an artificial lake generated by the comprehensive development plan of Nakdong River in 1988. It also meets Hwangmae mountain which is possible to climb and from the peak, there are views of the lake.

Paragliding is also possible in Hapcheon. There were people killed during the county paragliding championship in 2007.

Climate
As Hapcheon-gun is landlocked, the climate is quite extreme. Average annual temperature is 13.0 °C with the lowest temperature of -16.9 °C (in 1974)  and the highest of 39.2 °C (in 1994). 
The rainfall is approximately 1275.6mm which is quite low compared to other Korean regions. The rainfall is heaviest in the summer.

Sister cities
 Bergen County, New Jersey, United States
 Mitoyo, Kagawa, Japan  
 Jangsu, North Jeolla, South Korea  
 Xinchang, China

See also
 Geography of South Korea
 Haeinsa

References

External links
County government website

 
Counties of South Gyeongsang Province